Kimberly Maria McLean, a.k.a. Lori Erica Kennedy Ruff (October 16, 1968 – December 24, 2010), was an American identity thief whose true identity remained unknown for nearly six years after her death. She was eventually identified as a native of suburban Philadelphia who left home at age 17, in the fall of 1986, because she did not get along with her mother and stepfather. Within the next two years, she obtained the birth certificate of Becky Sue Turner, a two-year-old girl who had died with her two sisters in a house fire in 1971. McLean used the child's birth certificate to obtain an Idaho state identification card, then moved to Texas and had her name legally changed to Lori Erica Kennedy.

Ruff gradually acquired more documents in her new name, including a Social Security number. After earning a GED and a college degree, she married into a wealthy East Texas family and gave birth to a daughter. Due to her off-putting, secretive behavior, she clashed with her husband's family, and her marriage eventually collapsed. She died by suicide in the driveway of her former in-laws' home in Longview, Texas, on Christmas Eve 2010. Authorities believe she initially traveled to the home with the intent of harming the family.

After her death, her husband and his family found the evidence of her falsified identity in a lock box in her closet. A 2013 Seattle Times feature article about the case was published in news outlets around the world and created enormous interest in the online "websleuth" community.

Ruff's true origins remained a mystery until 2016, when her identity was confirmed using a combination of public records and direct-to-consumer autosomal SNP analysis of her husband's and daughter's DNA, leading back to the McLean–Cassidy family on Philadelphia's Main Line.

Activities before marriage 
In May 1988, McLean obtained the birth certificate of Becky Sue Turner, a two-year-old girl who had died, along with two of her siblings, in a house fire in Fife, Washington in 1971. McLean requested the birth certificate in Bakersfield, California, Becky Sue Turner's birthplace. She then traveled to Idaho, where she used the document to obtain a state ID card on June 16.

McLean, posing as Becky Sue Turner, then appeared before a judge in Dallas on July 5, 1988, and legally changed her name to Lori Erica Kennedy. A week later, she obtained a Social Security number, removing traces of her true identity. She also took a birth date of July 18, 1969. She received a Texas driver license in 1989 and qualified for a GED the following year. She enrolled in Dallas County Community College, and in 1997 she graduated from the University of Texas at Arlington with a degree in business administration.

Marriage 
In 2003 McLean met Jon Blakely "Blake" Ruff, the son of a socially prominent family in East Texas, in a Bible study class. Ruff described her as being incredibly secretive, particularly regarding her past. She had told him she was from Arizona, that both her parents were dead, that she had had an unhappy childhood, and that she had no siblings; she also said her father had been a failed stockbroker. The couple eloped in January 2004 after Nancy Ruff, Blake's mother, inquired about placing a wedding announcement in the local newspaper. The only person in attendance at their wedding ceremony, held in a church outside Dallas, was the officiating preacher.

After getting married, the Ruffs moved to Leonard, Texas. They tried several times to have a child, but she had trouble conceiving and suffered multiple miscarriages. This led investigators to believe that Ruff was older than she claimed, although the difference turned out to be less than a year. She eventually gave birth to a baby girl via in vitro fertilisation in 2008.

Divorce and suicide

Marriage breakdown 
Ruff was "extremely protective" of her daughter, often refusing to let anyone else hold her and even taking the baby with her to use the bathroom. She would also obsessively track the Ruffs' family history and try to find out their family recipes, but she still refused to talk about her own past.

Eventually, Ruff did not want her in-laws to have any contact with her daughter; as a result, the Ruffs began encouraging Blake to get out of the marriage. After some failed marriage therapy sessions, Blake Ruff moved back to his parents' house in Longview and filed for divorce, leaving Lori with their daughter in Leonard.

Suicide 
In the months between the separation and Lori's suicide, she behaved very erratically. A neighbor recalled that she and her daughter appeared to be undernourished and that Lori would often ramble incoherently to herself while pacing back and forth outside. She also began sending harassing emails to the Ruffs, created a scene at a custody exchange, and stole a set of house keys from them. The harassment was so severe that the Ruffs filed a cease and desist order just before Lori's death.

On December 24, 2010, Ruff's body was discovered in her car in the Ruffs' driveway, dead from a self-inflicted gunshot. In the car were two suicide notes: One 11‑page note addressed to "my wonderful husband" and another addressed to her daughter, to be opened on her 18th birthday. The Ruffs opened and read the letter, but it contained only "ramblings  from a clearly disturbed person" and no details about Lori's past.

Investigation

Discovery of past 
After Lori's funeral, some of the Ruffs drove to Leonard to see if they could find out more about her in her house. The house was discovered in disarray, with piles of dirty dishes, laundry, and trash stacked up around the house, as well as shredded documents and papers with incoherent scribblings on them. They then discovered the lock box in a closet, pried it open with a screwdriver, and discovered the documentation of Ruff's past. Also found in the lock box was a paper with several seemingly random scribblings.

The suicide notes were quickly determined to be incoherent ramblings that offered no clues to Ruff's identity. Other papers included the birth certificate of Becky Sue Turner and a judge's ruling granting a name change to Lori Erica Kennedy. A friend of the family verified that Becky Sue Turner had died in a house fire at the age of 2.

The writings on the paper found in the lock box included the scribblings "North Hollywood police," "402 months," and "Ben Perkins." The nature of these scribblings led some followers of the case to believe that Ruff was trying to avoid prison time, due to the references to police, a possible jail-term length, and the name of Ben Perkins, a Los Angeles attorney. When contacted, however, Perkins stated that he had never heard of Becky Sue Turner or Lori Kennedy. (Perkins, who was black and who marketed his legal services to LA's African-American community, had never taken on a white client during his career.) In addition, there were no matches for the woman in any existing fingerprint and facial recognition databases. The fact that Ruff was able to cover up her identity so well in a time before the Internet has led to speculation that she had enlisted the services of a so-called identity broker.

In September 2011 the Ruff family, with the help of a congressional aide, sought the help of Joe Velling, an investigator for the Social Security Administration (SSA). Velling agreed to help identify her as a case of identify theft. After following numerous leads he was stumped, and sought the help of the general public to identify her through an article published June 22, 2013, in The Seattle Times. The article was subsequently republished in numerous newspapers around the world.

Identification 

Colleen Fitzpatrick, a former nuclear physicist who created  the field of forensic genealogy, learned of Lori Ruff in 2013 and began work on the case. Fitzpatrick had Ruff's husband and daughter tested by a direct-to-consumer testing company, through which she was able to obtain Ruff's DNA results using genetic genealogy phasing techniques, which essentially subtracted Blake Ruff's DNA from Lori's. Ruff had a first cousin named Cassidy on her list of matches; however, the name was very common and the cousin was not responsive.  After two years, Fitzpatrick finally identified Ruff when she discovered a third cousin match who was related to the Cassidys. Knowing the identity of the third cousin led her to Ruff's identity.

Fitzpatrick informed Joe Velling, who had in the meantime retired from the SSA. He flew to Pennsylvania to meet the potential family.  Velling approached a relative, who immediately identified the deceased Lori Ruff as Kimberly McLean.

See also 
List of solved missing person cases
Lyle Stevik, a 2001 suicide in Washington. The man used this alias at the hotel in which he stayed. He then hanged himself in his room. He was identified on May 8, 2018. His identity has been withheld at the request of his family.
Joseph Newton Chandler III, a 2002 suicide in Ohio who was also discovered to have been living under of the identity of someone who died in childhood years before; he was identified as Robert Nichols in 2018.
Peter Bergmann, the alias of a man who arrived in Sligo, Ireland, in 2009 and was found dead a few days later. His true identity remains unknown.
Suzanne Sevakis, a woman who lived and died under the name Sharon Marshall, the stepdaughter of convicted murderer Franklin Delano Floyd who passed her off as his wife.
Ghosting

References

Further reading 
Maureen O'Hagan, The Woman in the Strongbox Amazon Original Stories (July 31, 2018) Amazon page

1968 births
1980s missing person cases
2010 in Texas
2010 suicides
Formerly missing people
Identity theft incidents
Longview, Texas
Missing person cases in Pennsylvania
People from Cheltenham, Pennsylvania
People from Leonard, Texas
Suicides by firearm in Texas
University of Texas at Arlington alumni
History of women in Texas